Dorota Monika Klencz (born 19 July 1955) is a Polish gymnast. She competed at the 1972 Summer Olympics.

References

External links
 

1955 births
Living people
Polish female artistic gymnasts
Olympic gymnasts of Poland
Gymnasts at the 1972 Summer Olympics
Sportspeople from Zabrze
20th-century Polish women